Chowder Pally is a village in Yacharam mandal of Ranga Reddy district, Telangana, India.

History

Geography

Religious places

Politics

Transport

Schools

Agriculture

References

Villages in Ranga Reddy district